Weddings, Parties, Anything. was an Australian folk rock band formed in 1984 in Melbourne and continuing until 1999. Their name came from The Clash song "Revolution Rock". Musicologist Billy Pinnell described their first album as the best Australian rock debut since Skyhooks' Living in the 70's.

The band was led by Mick Thomas, the only continual member throughout the group's history. The single "Father's Day" was nominated for Single of the Year as well as winning Song of the Year at the 1993 ARIA awards. They were renowned for their energetic live performances and in particular their annual Christmas shows at the Central Club Hotel in Swan Street, Richmond held in the lead up to Christmas Eve every year from the late 1980s to 1998.

The band have reunited to play live on a number of occasions since their original breakup. In November 2012 the band were inducted into the EG Hall of Fame, with Mick Thomas stating that the show would be the last time the band performed. The band reunited in March 2021 for two shows in Victoria.

Biography

1984–1986: Formation years
Mick Thomas grew up in Geelong, Victoria, Australia, where he played in bush bands in his youth. In 1981 (at age 21) he moved to Melbourne and after a couple of years in Melbourne's pub rock scene with bands like Where's Wolfgang and Trial, Thomas formed the first version of Weddings, Parties, Anything. in late 1984.

Thomas' idea behind Weddings Parties Anything was to combine that punk rock inspiration with his original love for the honest storytelling in folk music. The band was essentially based on a song he'd written, "Away, Away".

In early 1985 the group's original piano accordion player Wendy Joseph was replaced by Mark Wallace. Thomas had placed an ad looking for an accordion player, but didn't receive any responses. He then looked through the phone book for music schools and lists of their past students. After four or five schools he came up with Mark "Wally" Wallace, who'd been playing in his dad's Scottish Club band. Wallace was also listening to rock bands such as The Violent Femmes and like Thomas he was keen to put the accordion into a modern context.

Another inclusion to the line-up was guitarist Dave Steel (Strange Tenants and Fire Down Below).

With original drummer David Adams, it was this four piece Weddings, Parties, Anything. which released a four track self-titled EP on the group's own Suffering Tram label. By the time they released their version of Tex Morton's "Sergeant Small" as a single, the line-up comprised Michael Thomas, Mark Wallace, Dave Steel, bassist Janine Hall (formerly of the band The Saints) and drummer Marcus Schintler returning to work with Thomas, after the two met at an audition as the rhythm section for Melbourne band Little Murders two years earlier. Clarke, Schintler and Thomas worked on early versions of "Away, Away" and "The River is Wide", never performing live. "Sergeant Small" was written in the 1930s about the Queensland Railway Police, and was banned soon after its release in Australia.

1987–1995: First albums and success
In April 1987 Weddings, Parties, Anything. released its first album, Scorn of the Women. They recorded it as another independent release, but on the strength of their growing live following, the group ended up being offered a recording contract and the album was released by Warners. Janine Hall left the band following the release of the album, and was replaced by Peter Lawler, adding a mandolin to the band's repertoire. It was that line-up that produced 1988's Roaring Days. 1988 also saw Weddings Parties Anything winning its first ARIA music awards for Best New Talent, followed by another ARIA in 1989 for ARIA Award for Best Indigenous Release (Roaring Days).

Dave Steel left the band following a tour of North America, citing exhaustion as the chief reason. He also noted in several interviews, at the time of his departure (1988), that he was feeling frustrated not getting a lot of his material on the Weddings Parties Anything albums. He released his debut solo album through WEA in 1989. He was replaced by Richard Burgman (The Sunnyboys, The Saints) for the band's 1989 release, The Big Don't Argue, and accompanying tours.

In 1989 the band won a third ARIA for Best Indigenous Release (The Big Don't Argue), the second such award, with the nomination causing the band to boycott the awards for the second year running. In 1990 Weddings Parties Anything parted company with Warners.

The band spent a great deal of time touring over the next three years, and managed to release only one EP in 1990, titled The Weddings Play Sports (and Falcons), featuring cover versions of the bands The Sports, and Jo Jo Zep & The Falcons. The band resurfaced in 1992 with the release of Difficult Loves and yet another guitarist, Paul Thomas (Huxton Creepers), replacing the departing Richard Burgman. It was only when the album was finished that at a new distribution deal was signed, with RooArt. The single "Father's Day" reached No. 29 on the ARIA charts and was nominated for 'Single of the Year' as well as winning 'Song of the Year' at the 1993 ARIA awards). This line-up (Michael Thomas, Paul Thomas, Mark Wallace, Marcus Schintler, and Peter Lawler) remained intact for another two years, producing another album, King Tide in October 1993, charting at No. 45, with the single "Monday's Experts" reaching No. 45.

Following the world tour to promote that release, Marcus Schintler left the band for family reasons (later joining Sydney surf band The Wetsuits with Jon Schofield, Clyde Bramley, Stephen "Bones" Martin and Katrina Amiss). Schintler went on to pursue a career in government as Chief of Staff to the NSW Minister for Industrial Relations and Aboriginal Affairs. Peter Lawler left a year later to pursue a solo career (later to work with Jimmy Barnes and Tim Rogers among others).

1996–present: Reformation with new lineup
Thomas reformed the band, and by 1996, the new Weddings, Parties, Anything. lineup was ready for its first release, the independently produced Donkey Serenade. The band now included Jen Anderson (violins, mandolin; formerly of the band The Black Sorrows), Michael Barclay (drums; Paul Kelly & The Messengers, Little Murders), Stephen O'Prey (bass; formerly of The Badloves), as well as Michael Thomas, Paul Thomas and Mark Wallace. The music style shifted somewhat from folk to a more alternative country sound. The band decided to concentrate on the Australian market, and did less touring outside of their native Australia.

The band finished 1997 with a new release and what was to be its final studio album, Riveresque on a new label (Mushroom/Sony). By 1998, the band decided to take a break and work on several solo projects, including Michael Thomas's musical Over in the West.

Weddings, Parties, Anything. initially gained a reputation as a hot new band through their constant touring in their early days, but they never really became a commercial success. They did, however, form a fanatical supporter base, known as the "Wedheads", that continued to sustain the band for years.

Upon the conclusion of the band several members continued on to other projects, with Thomas embarking on a solo career and eventually settling with a new band, The Sure Thing, which went through many different lineups. He also established Croxton Records with friend Nick Corr. Thomas has also written or co-written plays, including Over in the West and The Tank, and is an accomplished music producer and engineer.

Jen Anderson composed live music for the black and white silent movie Pandora's Box and to accompany The Sentimental Bloke for the Melbourne International Film Festival. She has toured with Tiddas, Paul Kelly and Archie Roach, and she composed the soundtracks for Clara Law's film The Goddess of 1967 and the TV mini-series Simone de Beauvoir's Babies. She has performed on albums for Dave Graney, Hunters and Collectors, and Nick Cave and the Bad Seeds, and has produced recordings by Ruby Hunter and the Waifs.

Further reformations
Weddings, Parties, Anything. reformed for the Community Cup Football match in July 2005 and also performed at the Corner Hotel in Melbourne as a warm-up show two nights prior. The band reformed again later the next year for a one-off performance at the Queenscliff Music Festival in November 2006.

In January 2008, Weddings, Parties, Anything. announced March/April dates for the band's Ten Year Reunion Tour 2008, including an international performance at the Astoria (formerly The Mean Fiddler) in London on 25 April (ANZAC Day). They sold out four consecutive shows at Melbourne venue The Corner Hotel, adding a fifth to surpass the record previously held by the Hilltop Hoods from 2004.

In 2010, 2011 and 2012 the band played Grand Final Eve shows in Melbourne.

On 20 November 2012, the band were inducted into the EG Hall of Fame (Entertainment Guide – The Age). The band played at the event, which was held at Billboard The Venue in Melbourne. Joined by original guitarist Dave Steel, they performed their first album, Scorn of the Women, in its entirety. In the lead-up to the show, The Age newspaper reported that Mick Thomas had posted on his Facebook page that it would be the last time the band performed, using the show to say a heartfelt farewell to long-standing fans.

The band reunited for two shows on 27 and 28 March 2021 at the Archies Creek Hotel in Victoria. The shows were intended as a warm-up for the band's scheduled performance at the Byron Bay Bluesfest, which was subsequently cancelled due to COVID-19.

Live performances and Christmas shows
Renowned for their energetic live shows, Weddings, Parties, Anything. had a handful of live songs that were nearly always guaranteed to push the mosh pit into a frenzy, particularly "A Tale They Won't Believe", the story of Alexander Pearce, a cannibal in the convict days of Tasmania. Fans would traditionally have coins ready to throw at the band as they sang the chorus of "Ticket in Tatts", while shielding their eyes. This was in reference to the lyrics concerning being "ten cents short of a dollar".

The legendary Christmas shows were held at the Central Club Hotel in Swan Street, Richmond in the lead up to Christmas Eve every year from the late 1980s to 1998. Due to their increasing popularity and live reputation as a band, the number of concerts increased as the years progressed, culminating with seven nights in a row for the last year, 1998. In the liner notes for the CD They Were Better Live, a live recording of the concerts from the final year, the bands main songwriter and singer Mick Thomas stated:

Live recording
Various songs from the last shows in 1998 (and one track from 3 January 1999 at the Belvoir Amphitheatre near Perth, Western Australia) were recorded and released as a double live album, They Were Better Live, which was nominated for an ARIA award in 1999 for 'Best Blues & Roots Album'). The last performance was also the basis of a play, A Party in Fitzroy, by Victorian playwright Ross Mueller.

Musical style
Musically, Weddings, Parties, Anything. were a combination of Australian indie and garage rock, sixties folk, punk and (later) country and are usually described as being a folk rock band. The audience for the band was close to a mainstream rock crowd, their folk credentials were further evidenced by Celtic influences and an affinity for traditional Australian songs ("Streets of Forbes", "Sergeant Small"), plus original songs by Thomas which drew upon a similar repository of colonial folklore ("A Tale They Won’t Believe"). Canadian commentator Jeremy Mouat concluded that their "music is largely concerned with the connections between past and present, whether it be the bond of memory or an identification with tradition". They led what later became known as the alt-country scene in Melbourne. The band were often compared to The Pogues, though the two bands were actually contemporaries rather than one following the other; the two bands toured Australia together in the early '90s.

Members
Current
Mick Thomas (vocals, guitar, mandolin) 1984–1999, reunions from 2005–
Mark Wallace (piano accordion, keyboards, vocals) 1985–1999, reunions from 2005–
Paul Thomas (guitar, pedal steel) 1989–1999, reunions from 2005–
Michael Barclay (drums, vocals) 1993–1999, reunions from 2005–
Stephen O'Prey (bass guitar, guitar, vocals) 1993–1999, reunions from 2005–
Jen Anderson (violin, mandolin, guitar, vocals) 1992–1999, reunions from 2005–

Former members
Dave Adams (drums) 1984–1986
Richard Burgman (guitar, mandolin, tin whistle, vocals) 1988–1989
Paul Clarke (guitar) 1984–1985
Jaxin Hall (bass guitar, vocals) 1986–1987
Wendy Joseph (violin) 1984
Peter Lawler (bass guitar, vocals) 1987–1993
Marcus Schintler (drums, melodica, vocals) 1986–1993
Dave Steel (guitar, vocals) 1985–1988

Discography

Studio albums

Live albums

Compilation albums

Extended plays

Singles

DVD/video
Live in Richmond/Christmas at the Central Club VHS - 18 song live recording at the Central Club in Melbourne, 1993. The video also contains interviews with members of the band between songs.
Into Time On VHS - 20 song recording of the band playing at the Metropolis Nightclub in Perth on Friday, 16 October 1998.
Siren VHS - Live recording of the band's last official performance at the Belvoir Amphitheatre in Perth, in January 1999.
Long Time Between Drinks DVD/CD - Recorded live at the Queenscliff Music Festival, November 2006. Extras include music videos and Roaring Days film. Released in December 2007.

Awards

ARIA Music Awards
The ARIA Music Awards is an annual awards ceremony that recognises excellence, innovation, and achievement across all genres of Australian music. They commenced in 1987 Weddings Parties Anything won two awards from seven nominations.

|-
| 1988
| Scorn of the Women
| ARIA Award for Best New Talent
| 
|-
| 1989
| Roaring Days
| ARIA Award for Best Indigenous Release
| 
|-
| rowspan="2"| 1990
| rowspan="2"| The Big Don't Argue
| ARIA Award for Best Indigenous Release
| 
|-
| ARIA Award for Best Cover Art
| 
|-
| rowspan="2"| 19883
| rowspan="2"| "Father's Day"
| ARIA Award for Song of the Year
| 
|-
| ARIA Award for Single of the Year
| 
|-
| 1999
| They Were Better Live
| ARIA Award for Best Blues and Roots Album
| 
|-

The Age EG Awards
The Age EG Awards are an annual awards night celebrating Victorian music. They commenced in 2005.

|-
| 2012 || Weddings, Parties, Anything|| Hall Of Fame || 
|-

References

External links
 Mick Thomas' website - Weddings Parties Anything updates
 Howlspace.com
 Mushroom records - artist profile
 Australian Encyclopedia of Rock & Pop article

Victoria (Australia) musical groups
ARIA Award winners